Souhail, Suhail, Sohail or other variants is an Arabic term commonly used as a male given name and surname.

Souhail or its variants may refer to:

Astronomy
 Suhail or Lambda Velorum (λ Velorum), a star in the southern constellation of Vela
 Suhail (star), several stars traditionally called Suhail or variants thereof
 Canopus or Suhayl, the second-brightest star in the night sky

People

Given name

Sohail
 Sohail Ahmed (born 1963), Pakistani comedian
 Sohail Butt (born 1966), Pakistani cricketer
 Sohail Khan (born 1970), Bollywood actor/director
 Sohail Sen (born 1984), Indian film composer
 Sohail Tanvir (born 1984), Pakistani cricketer

Souhail
 Souhail Hamouchane (born 1997), Moroccan swimmer

Souheil
 Souheil Ben-Barka (born 1942), Moroccan film director

Suhail
 Suhail Abdulla (born 1999), Emirati footballer
 Suhail Akbar, a fictional character in the Left Behind series of novels
 Sohail Aman (born 1959), retired Chief of Staff of the Pakistan Air Force
 Suhail Andleev (born 1982), Indian cricketer
 Suhail Bahwan (born 1938/39), Omani businessman
 Suhail Chandhok, Indian television presenter and commentator 
 Suhail Galadari (born 1977), Emirati business man, 
 Suhail Iftikhar (born 1986), Norwegian cricketer
 Suhail A. Khan, American activist
 Suhail Yusuf Khan (born 1988), Indian sarangi player
 Suhail Koya, Indian Malayalam lyricist and screenwriter
 Suhail Al-Mansoori (born 1993), Emirati footballer
 Suhail Al Mazroui, Emirati businessman and politician
 Suhail Nayyar (born 1989), Bollywood actor
 Suhail Al-Noubi (born 1996), Emirati footballer
 Suhail Rizvi, American businessman
 Suhail Sharma (born 1981), Indian cricketer

Suhayl
 Suhayl ibn Amr (died 639), a famous speaker and contemporary of the Islamic prophet Muhammad

Suheil
 Suheil al-Hassan (born 1970), Brigadier General in the Syrian Army

Suheyl
 Süheyl Batum (born 1965), Turkish academic

Middle name
 Mir Suhail Qadri (born 1989), political cartoonist from Kashmir
 Mohammed Suhail Chinya Salimpasha (born 2001), Indian malnutrition researcher and inventor
 Muhammad Suhail Zubairy (born 1952), Pakistani professor of physics

Surname
 Abdelouahed Souhail (born 1946), Moroccan politician

Suhail
 Ahmed Suhail (born 1999), Qatari footballer
 Ahmed Al-Suhail (born 1988), Saudi football player
 Iqbal Suhail, Urdu poet
 Qusay al-Suhail, Iraqi politician
 Rami Suhail (born 2000), Qatari professional footballer
 Ushna Suhail (born 1993), Pakistani female tennis player

Arabic masculine given names
Turkish masculine given names